St. John's was a church in Dresden dedicated to Saint John the Baptist. It was built from 1874 to 1878 to designs by Gotthilf Ludwig Möckel, making it the first known neo-Gothic building in the city. It was damaged by bombing in the Second World War and demolished in 1954.

References 

John's
Demolished buildings and structures in Germany
Buildings and structures demolished in 1954
Buildings and structures in Germany destroyed during World War II